Scoops — Ice Cream Fun for Everyone is a strategy video game developed by NimbleBit for IOS devices. The game features in-app purchases and was initially released on August 1, 2009. The point of the game is for the player to stack their ice cream cone as high as they can, eventually past the moon.

Gameplay

In Scoops - Ice Cream Fun for Everyone the player's goal is to stack their ice cream cone by tilting the screen to catch the scoops, and avoid the falling vegetables. On the upper right of the screen the player has three stars. Stars are lost when a vegetable is caught instead of a scoop. This means the player can not catch three or more vegetables.

Themes
In-game there is also an option where the player can pick themes. These themes include Classic, SkyBurger, Kawaii, Doodle, Monster, Cupcake, Dizzypad, and Hats. The default theme is Classic. Other than SkyBurger, all other themes are available as in-app purchases.

Similarities to Sky Burger
Another one of NimbleBit's games Sky Burger is similar as in the objective is to stack items by tilting the screen. In the Themes section of the app, there is even a Sky Burger theme for the game.

See also
 NimbleBit
 Tiny Tower
 Pocket Planes
 Sky Burger

References

External links
NimbleBit Official Website

2009 video games
IOS games
NimbleBit games
Single-player video games
Strategy video games
Video games about food and drink